Petawawa is a town located in the eastern portion of Southern Ontario.  Situated in the Ottawa Valley, with a population of 18,160 (2021 Census), Petawawa is the most populous municipality in Renfrew County.

Geography
The town lies on the west bank of the Ottawa River, at the confluence of the Petawawa River. Situated across the Ottawa River from the Laurentian Mountains, and east of Algonquin Park, Petawawa is a favourite stop for outdoor enthusiasts, anglers, hikers, canoers, and kayakers.

Demographics 

Transportation
Ontario Highway 17, Ontario Northlands bus service from Ottawa and the local commercial airport (Pembroke Airport) located in Petawawa, all provide access to this town.

Primary industries
Petawawa's primary employer is the Canadian Government. Most of Petawawa's residents work as civilian employees, or as members of the Canadian Forces at CFB Petawawa which is home to 2 Canadian Mechanized Brigade Group and 4 Canadian Division Support Group.

Another major employer is Chalk River Laboratories located nearby in Chalk River.

History
The earliest settlement in the Petawawa area was inhabited by the Algonquin First Nation. The name of Petawawa originates from a local Algonquin language word, biidaawewe, meaning "where one hears a noise like this". The original spelling of the name of the town was Petewawa and while there are no sources showing when it officially changed to Petawawa, Privy Council documents indicate the name Petawawa being formally used in correspondence as early as 27 March 1907. Research of photographs after 1916 with the former spelling have not been found. While the records of the official name change are non-existent, it has been speculated that the influx of immigration to the area changed the pronunciation of the word from its native roots to a more European pronunciation. Over time this may have changed the spelling of the Town's name into the present day format.

In the late 19th century, the area was surveyed and settled by emigres from Scotland, Ireland and Germany. The land was unsuitable for crops, but the heavily forested surroundings were useful for logging. Petawawa was incorporated as a township in 1865. The Canadian military acquired land in the area in 1905, which later became Canadian Forces Base Petawawa. During this period it was used as an internment camp for German POWs during World War I. and World War II. Later, it became home to the Canadian Airborne Regiment before it was disbanded in 1995. Today, it is one of Canada's largest ground forces bases with members deployed throughout the world on various missions supporting the United Nations in peacekeeping or the War on Terror.

In 1961, the urban area of Petawawa was incorporated as a separate village. On July 1, 1997, the village and township re-amalgamated to form the Town of Petawawa.

Climate
Petawawa has a humid continental climate (Köppen Dfb) with long, cold, snowy winters and warm summers.

Communities

In addition to the primary urban core of Petawawa, the town also comprises the communities of Black Bay, Kramer Subdivision, Laurentian View, McGuire, Petawawa Point, Pine Meadows, Pine Ridge, Pinehurst Estates and Riverview.

Notable residents

Entertainers
 Tom Green, comedian/actor
 Tommy Mac, Hedley bassist

Sports
 Roy Giesebrecht, retired NHL hockey player 
 Lloyd Mohns, retired NHL hockey player
 Matthew Peca, NHL hockey player for the Ottawa Senators
 Joe Reekie, retired NHL hockey player 
 Mike Rowe, retired NHL hockey player 
 Ray Sheppard, retired NHL hockey player

See also
 List of communities in Ontario
List of townships in Ontario
List of francophone communities in Ontario

References

External links

Municipalities in Renfrew County
Towns in Ontario
Lower-tier municipalities in Ontario